Ron Ponte (born ) is an Israeli female former volleyball player, playing as a setter. She was part of the Israel women's national volleyball team for the KKTA Tel Aviv team. She was the Israeli National Champion in 2017-18.

She competed at the 2011 Women's European Volleyball Championship.

In the 2010 Euroleague, she placed third. She is a three-time national  championship, a five-time cup holder. Ponte also played as a foreign player for the German First Division.

References

1988 births
Living people
Israeli women's volleyball players
Place of birth missing (living people)